"Jimmy Choo" is a song by American rapper Fetty Wap. It was released on February 5, 2016 and was produced by K.E. on the Track. The song sampled the intro part of The Psychedelic Furs' 1982 hit song Love My Way (song), most famous today for its use in the 2017 Oscar nominee coming-of-age drama by italian director Luca Guadagnino Call Me by Your Name.

Release
Fetty Wap first released the track on his SoundCloud on November 5, 2015. The song rose to popularity through a vine that went viral, featuring two girls dancing to the song. This led to the song's official release on February 5, 2016, via digital distribution as a single. Lyrically, he serenades a lady wearing the designer heels. Noted by Billboard, the song contains an "undulating" hook ("Jimmy Choo’s on her feet when she be walkin'"), delivered in his "half-mumbled" vocal style against a smooth, clubby backdrop.

Commercial performance
"Jimmy Choo" debuted at number 69 on Billboard Hot 100 for the chart dated February 21, 2016. Its chart debut was supported by first-week sales of 35,045 copies. As of March 2016, the single sold over 113,000 copies in the US. "Jimmy Choo" marked the fifth consecutive single to enter the top 10 on the Hot Rap Songs chart by Fetty Wap.

Charts

Weekly charts

References

External links

2016 singles
2015 songs
Fetty Wap songs
Songs written by Fetty Wap
300 Entertainment singles
Songs written by Richard Butler (singer)
Song recordings produced by K.E. on the Track